Stolen Youth: Inside the Cult at Sarah Lawrence is an American true crime documentary miniseries, directed by Zachary Heinzerling, revolving around Larry Ray and the cult at Sarah Lawrence College. It premiered on February 9, 2023, on Hulu.

Premise
Explores Larry Ray and his cult at Sarah Lawrence College. It follows the stories of the victims and some of their family members and friends.

Episodes

Cast

 

Larry Ray, Cult leader who lived on the campus with his daughter Talia in 2008. He would lie and tell all his roommates to lie and videotape it. He manipulated and convinced them they did things that they didn't do and then asked for payment because of the "damages" done to him. According to New York Magazine, Larry was diagnosed with histrionic and narcissistic personality disorders. In 2003, he was sentenced to five years probation with securities fraud. In January 2023, he was sentenced to 60 years in prison for racketeering conspiracy, violent crime in aid of racketeering, extortion, sex trafficking, forced labor, tax evasion, and money laundering offenses.

 Talia Ray, Larry's daughter who attended Sarah Lawrence College.

 Santos, A former boyfriend of Talia and roommate with Larry. 

 Felicia, Santos' oldest sister.

 Isabella Pollok, Talia's roommate and best friend at the time. She moved in with Larry in 2009 in NYC. She lived with him and Felicia until he got arrested a decade later. 

 Dan Levin, Moved in with Larry in 2009 and dated Isabella. He was abused by Larry and left the cult in 2013.

 Claudia, A former victim of Larry and friend of some of the other victims. She was brainwashed into prostitution and handed Larry over a million dollars as payments for "damages" done to him. Larry convinced her that she poisoned her roommates and spread rumors about him.  

 Yalitza, Santos and Felicia's sister. Victim of Larry. 

 Raven, Friend of some of the victims. She told them in person after graduation that they were in a cult.

Production
In November 2022, it was announced Zachary Heinzerling had directed a documentary series revolving around Larry Ray, with Story Syndicate producing and Hulu distributing.

References

External links
 

2020s American documentary television series
English-language television shows
True crime television series
Television series about cults
Hulu original programming